Kostas Linoxilakis (5 March 1933 – 3 December 2014) was a Greek former international and Olympic footballer.

Career
Linoxilakis started his career at Asteras Athens and was centre back of Panathinaikos from 1950 when he was only 17 years old until the 1962–1963 season. He was capped a total of 28 times by the Greece national team during his career, scoring 1 goal. He competed for He was member of the national side for the 1952 Olympic Games.

After his football career was over, he entered local politics and was elected to the Athens City Council.

References

External links

1933 births
2014 deaths
Super League Greece players
Panathinaikos F.C. players
Footballers from Athens
Greek footballers
Greece international footballers
Olympic footballers of Greece
Footballers at the 1952 Summer Olympics
Association football defenders
Mediterranean Games gold medalists for Greece
Mediterranean Games medalists in football
Footballers at the 1951 Mediterranean Games